State Route 385 (SR 385) is the designation for two non-contiguous segments of east–west controlled-access highway in the Memphis metropolitan area in Shelby County, Tennessee, separated by a section of Interstate 269 (I-269). The northern section, designated as Paul W. Barret Parkway runs between U.S. Route 51 (US 51) in Millington and I-40 in Arlington, both of which are suburbs of Memphis. The southern segment, known as Bill Morris Parkway, runs between I-240 in southeastern Memphis, and I-269 in Collierville, and also serves the city of Germantown. The northern segment, combined with I-269, serves as a partial outer beltway around Memphis, and the southern segment serves as a spur route between the city and its southeastern suburbs, and is notable for its almost-exclusive use of single-point urban interchanges (SPUIs). 

The highway that is now SR 385 was originally envisioned in the 1960s. The first section to be completed was part of the northern section in the early 1980s. The southern section was constructed in multiple sections between 1990 and 2000, with an extension opening in 2007. The highway was originally one continuous route until 2018, when the section between I-269 in Collierville and I-40 in Arlington, which opened in segments between 2007 and 2013, was redesignated as part of I-269.

Route description
State Route 385 consists of two noncontiguous sections, designated as Bill Morris Parkway and Paul W. Barret Parkway, that are separated by a section of I-269. Both sections are located entirely within Shelby County.

Paul W. Barret Parkway
SR 385 begins at US 51 in an east–west orientation in the southern part of Millington in a partial-diamond interchange that is graded to allow for a possible westward extension. It immediately has its first interchange with Raleigh-Millington Road where it shifts to the southeast. A short distance later, the freeway reaches SR 204 a connector to the Naval Support Activity Mid-South base. The highway then shifts eastward again and enters the edge of a rural area north of Memphis. A short distance later is an interchange with SR 14 (Austin Peay Highway). Passing though mostly farmland with some residential areas, the freeway reaches Brunswick Road a few miles later, before interchanging with Stewart Road a short distance beyond. The freeway then shifts east−southeast before turning to the southeast. It then crosses the Loosahatchie River where it enters Arlington and has a near-full cloverleaf interchange with US 70/79. It then veers southward over the next  before reaching I-40 at a cloverleaf interchange where the route continues to the south as I-269.

Bill Morris Parkway
SR 385 begins at a direction-T interchange with I-240 in southeast Memphis along the north bank of Nonconnah Creek. This interchange provides direct unobstructed access between the route and the Mt. Moriah Road interchange on I-240. Proceeding in an east-southeast alignment as a six-lane freeway, the parkway quickly has its first interchange with Ridgeway Road, the only interchange with a surface street along this segment that is not a single point urban interchange (SPUI). It then crosses a floodplain and has an interchange with Kirby Parkway. Shifting slightly southeast, the freeway crosses Nonconnah Creek, and meets Riverdale Road. It then shifts into a direct east–west alignment and crosses Nonconnah Creek again, before shifting sharply southward, and interchanging with Winchester Road where it reduces to four lanes. The highway then crosses Nonconnah Creek for a third time before shifting southeastwardly again and reaching Hacks Cross Road. A short distance later, the route briefly curves eastward where it interchanges with Forest Hill Irene Road before entering Collierville. It then curves slightly southeast and then to the east–northeast and reaches an interchange with Houston Levee Road. A short distance later it shifts southeast at an interchange with Byhalia Road before turning northeastward at an interchange with U.S. Route 72. The freeway then reaches its eastern terminus at a directional-T interchange with I-269 along the Shelby–Fayette County line, which is also the boundary between the cities of Collierville and Piperton.

History

Background and construction
The first section of SR 385 built was the section of Paul W. Barret Parkway built between US 51 and SR 204 in Millington, completed around 1982. On September 25, 1998, a section of Paul Barret Parkway opened from SR 204 to US 70/79.

The Bill Morris Parkway section of SR 385 was conceived in 1969. The project was one of six major freeway projects, referred to at the time as "Bicentennial Parkways", that was initiated by the passage of the Better Roads Program in 1986 by the Tennessee General Assembly. This segment was initially referred to as the "Nonconnah Parkway" due to its proximity to Nonconnah Creek. 

The first contract for construction of the Nonconnah Parkway was awarded on August 3, 1990, at a cost of $44.75 million (equivalent to $ in ), which was at the time the most expensive contract ever awarded by TDOT. The segment between I-240 and Ridgeway Road opened on December 24, 1993, to eastbound traffic, and on January 15, 1994, to westbound traffic. The route was extended to Riverdale Road and opened on December 22, 1995. The portion from Riverdale Road to Houston Levee Road opened on December 29, 1997. The extension to Byhalia Road opened in mid-October 1999. The segment between Byhalia Road and US 72 was completed on November 21, 2000. Work began on the extension to SR 57 in June 2003, and this section, part of which is now part of I-269, opened on August 23, 2007.

Winfield Dunn Parkway and I-269

The segment of Interstate 269 between I-40 and what is now the eastern terminus of Bill Morris Parkway was originally signed as part of SR 385. The last section of this part opened on November 22, 2013. In 2018, portions of this segment were redesignated as I-269.

Exit list

See also

References

External links

LordSutch.com: Tennessee Highway 385
Memphis Commercial Appeal Archives from 1990-2011

Interstate 69
385
Transportation in Memphis, Tennessee
Freeways in Tennessee